Vmobile was a Nigerian mobile phone network provider with close to a million subscribers in 2004. The company was previously owned by Econet Wireless Nigeria, but after a shareholder dispute was purchased (for a month) by Vodacom of South Africa. The Vodacom deal was short lived, and the operator soon thereafter began trading as VMobile Nigeria, owned by Vee Netoworks Limited. The name Vee was based on Vee from Vodacom, after Vodacom pulled out of the deal. Vodacom's South African staff was retained by the Nigerian Investors, to run the now called VMobile network. Willem Swart was appointed as CEO, with a number of previous Econet staff as directors.

The company claimed that all investors were Nigeria-based. They included the state governments of Lagos, Delta and Akwa Ibom. On April 16, 2006, Celtel made a conditional offer for Vmobile and in May 2006, Vmobile was bought over by Celtel for US$1.005. billion after Celtel acquired a controlling stake of 65% in Vmobile

During its time, Vmobile branded itself as the network for the Nigerian people, with the catch phrase being "its all about you".

References

External links
Celtel Company Website
Interview with Willem Swart

Telecommunications companies of Nigeria
Defunct mobile phone companies